The 2023 Singapore Premier League (also known as the AIA Singapore Premier League due to sponsorship reasons) is the 5th season of the Singapore Premier League, the top-flight Singaporean professional league for association football clubs, since its rebranding in 2018.

Format
The following key changes were made to the rules for the 2023 season:
 Young Lions will be allowed to register between 20 and 40 players, three of whom may be foreign or overaged Singaporean players.
 Young Lions and Hougang United to play their home games at Jalan Besar Stadium while Lion City Sailors and Balestier Khalsa will play at Bishan Stadium.  Other stadiums used are: (1) Our Tampines Hub (Tampines Rovers and Geylang International), (2) Jurong East Stadium (Albirex Niigata and Tanjong Pagar United), and (3) Hassanal Bolkiah National Stadium (DPMM).  DPMM will play their 1st three home matches in Jalan Besar Stadium as their home ground is undergoing renovation.
 For Brunei DPMM, they are required to have a minimum of one Under-23 player of Bruneian nationality fielded during the entire first half of a match.
 All clubs may include a maximum of five players from its COE Under-21 team in its match-day squad.
 VAR technology will feature for the first time in Singapore league history.

The following key changes were made to the rules since the 2022 season:

 Each team is able to register up to 25 players in their squad, a reduction of 3 players as compared from 2020.
 Albirex is allowed to have a minimum squad of eighteen (18) Players under non-amateur (Professional) contract, as at the pre-season minimum registration deadline and a maximum of twenty-five (25) Players.
 From 2021, Albirex is allowed to sign a maximum of 2 overage Singaporean players.  One U-23 Singaporeans need to be in their starting lineup for each game.
 Clubs will be equipped with Global Positioning Systems (GPS) devices - among other performance and tracking gear. Value of the sponsorship is  worth around $620,000.
 SPL clubs are now allowed to register a maximum of four foreign players with no age restrictions, of whom at least one shall be of the nationality of an AFC Member Association (Asian). A maximum of four foreign players may be named or fielded in any one match.
 Players shall be allocated jersey numbers 1 to 50. Jersey number become available for allocation to new members after a player ceased to play for a club.
 1st transfer window:  1 January 2023 to 19 March 2023, 2nd transfer window: 1 June 2023 to 28 June 2023

Teams 
A total of 9 teams competed in the league. Albirex Niigata (S) is invited foreign club from Japan respectively. DPMM FC is invited foreign club from Brunei

Stadiums and locations

Personnel, kit and sponsoring 
Note: Flags indicate national team as has been defined under FIFA eligibility rules. Players may hold more than one non-FIFA nationality.

Coaching changes

Foreign players 
Singapore Premier League clubs can sign a maximum of four foreign players in the 2021 season, up from three as compared to 2019. However, one of them has to be am AFC player.

Albirex Niigata can sign up unlimited number of Singaporean players for the new season. Only 2 local player above 23 years old is allowed.

Players name in bold indicates the player was registered during the mid-season transfer window.

Note 1: From 2021, Albirex is allowed to sign a maximum of 2 Singaporean players above the age of 23.

Note 2: Young Lions can register a total of three foreign or overaged Singaporean players.

Results

League table

Fixtures and results

Matches 1–16

Matches 17-24

Statistics

Top scorers

 As of 19 Mar 2023

Top assists
 As at 19 Mar 2023

Own goal 
 As at 14 Mar 2023

Hat-tricks 
 As at 10 Mar 2023

Clean sheets
 As at 19 Mar 2023

Penalty missed 
 As at 15 Mar 2023

Referee's record 
 As at 19 Mar 2023

Team's discipline 
 As at 19 Mar 2023

Player's discipline 
 As at 15 Mar 2023

Awards

Monthly awards

References

External links
 Football Association of Singapore website
 Singapore Premier League website

2023
2023 in association football
2023 in Asian association football leagues